The 31st annual Cairo International Film Festival was held from November 27 to December 7, 2007. English director Nicolas Roeg was the President of the Jury.

Films in competition
The following films competed for the Golden Pyramid.

Digital Competition
The following films were screened in the Digital Competition for Feature Films category.

Arab Competition
The following films were screened in the Arab Competition for Feature Films category.

Films out of competition
The following films were screened out of the competition.

Juries

International Competition
 Nicolas Roeg, English director (President)
 Zhang Jingchu, Chinese actress
 Hesham Selim, Egyptian actor
 Sandra Nashaat, Egyptian director
 Ildikó Enyedi, Hungarian director
 Tilde Corsi, Italian  producer
 Moon So-ri, South Korean actress
 Jillali Ferhati, Moroccan director and screenwriter
 Krzysztof Zanussi, Polish director and screenwriter
 Mahamat Saleh Haroun, Chadian director
 Nurgül Yeşilçay, Turkish actress

Digital Competition
 Mohamed Abdel Aziz, Egyptian director (President)
 Michel Alexandre, French Screenwriter
 Tilman Scheel, German CEO
 Antonio Pizzo, Italian professor
 Naky Sy Savané, Ivoirian actress
 Peter Scarlet, American director of Tribeca Film Festival

Arab Competition
 Ahmed Al Maanouni, Moroccan director (President)
 Moufida Tlatli, Tunisian director
 Jamal Soliman, Syrian actor
 Hala Khalil, Egyptian director
 Samir Farag, Egyptian cinematographer

Awards
The winners of the 2007 Cairo International Film Festival were:

 Golden Pyramid: L'ennmie intime by Florent Emilio Siri
 Sliver Pyramid: Khuda Kay Liye by Shoaib Mansoor
 Best Director: Florent Emilio Siri for L'ennmie intime
 Saad El-Din Wahba Prize (Best Screenplay): Albert Ter Heerdt for Kicks
 Best Actor: Albert Dupontel for L'ennmie intime
 Best Actress:
 Marina Magro for Ópera
 Tatyana Lyutaeva for Polnoe Dykhanie
 Naguib Mahfouz Prize (Best Directorial Debut): Juan Patricio Riveroll for Ópera
 Youssef Chahine Prize (Best Artistic Contribution): Derviş Zaim for Cenneti Beklerken
 Special Mention: Matthew Beard for And When Did You Last See Your Father? (For Acting)
 Best Arabic Film: Waiting For Pasolini by Daoud Aoulad-Syad
 Arabic Film Special Mention: 
 The Seventh Heaven by Saad Hendawi
 Caramel by Nadine Labaki
 Golden Award for Digital Films: Xue chan by Peng Tao
 Silver Award for Digital Films: The Englishman by Ian Sellar
 FIPRESCI Prize: Juan Patricio Riveroll for Ópera

External links
Official Cairo International Festival Site (in English) 
 Cairo International Film Festival:2007 at Internet Movie Database

Cairo International Film Festival
2007 in Egypt
C
2000s in Cairo